The Richard C. DiPrima Prize is awarded every two years by the Society for Industrial and Applied Mathematics  to an early career researcher who has done outstanding research in applied mathematics. First awarded in 1988, it honors the memory of Richard C. DiPrima, a former president of SIAM who also served for many years as a member of its council and board of trustees, as vice president for programs, and as a dedicated and committed member.

Recipients 
The recipients of the Richard C. DiPrima Prize are:

 1988: Mary E. Brewster
 1990: No award
 1992: Anne Bourlioux
 1992: Robin Carl Young
 1994: Stephen Jonathan Chapman
 1996: David Paul Williamson
 1998: Bart De Schutter
 2000: Keith Lindsay
 2002: Gang Hu
 2004: Diego Dominici
 2006: Xinwei Yu
 2008: Daan Huybrechs
 2010: Colin B. Macdonald
 2012: Thomas Goldstein
 2014: Thomas D. Trogdon
 2016: Blake H. Barker
 2018: Peter Gangl
 2020: Anna Seigal

See also

 List of mathematics awards

References 

Awards of the Society for Industrial and Applied Mathematics